Shanghai 1937 (also released as Hotel Shanghai) is a 1997 German two-part miniseries directed by Peter Patzak for German Television. It was entered into the 20th Moscow International Film Festival.

Cast
 Agnieszka Wagner as Helen Russell
 Nicholas Clay as Bobby
 James McCaffrey as Frank Taylor
 Zhang Min
 Dieter Laser
 Robert Giggenbach
 Nigel Davenport as Butler
 Elliott Gould as Hutchinson
 Annie Girardot as Mme. Tissaud
 Patrick Ryecart as Sir Kingsdale-Smith

Reception
In a positive review for The Hollywood Reporter, Duane Byrge wrote, "Director Peter Patzak has fashioned a roiling entertainment, nicely transposing this sprawling story to a tight, filmic dimension. Technically, it's marvelous with its teeming visuals and captivating marches through old Shanghai. Highest praise to cinematographer Martin Stingl for the panoramic scopings, and particular praise to art director Qin Baisong for evoking the passions and terrors of the times."

In a negative review for Variety, Angela Baldassarre wrote, "Considering the large number of subplots, there is little room in Hotel Shanghai for character development; none of the personalities gets beyond mere introduction. The performances, thus, come across as incomplete and mediocre."

References

Further reading

External links
 

1997 films
1997 television films
1997 drama films
German television films
German drama films
English-language German films
1990s German-language films
English-language television shows
German-language television shows
Films directed by Peter Patzak
Films based on Austrian novels
Films set in Shanghai
Films set in 1937
Das Erste original programming
Television shows based on novels
Spy drama television films
1990s German films